Live Forever or Liveforever may refer to:

Plants
Dudleya, a genus of succulent plants
Hylotelephium, a genus of succulent perennial plants
Sempervivum, a genus of succulent plants

Music

Albums
Live Forever (The Screaming Jets album), 2002
Live Forever (Matthew West album), 2015 
Live Forever (Bartees Strange album), 2020
Live Forever – The Album, a 2007 album by Magnus Carlsson
Live Forever: September 23, 1980 • Stanley Theatre • Pittsburgh, PA, a 2011 live album by Bob Marley
Live Forever (Lil Peep mixtape), 2015
Live Forever (Jett Rebel album)

Songs
"Live Forever" (The Band Perry song), 2015
"Live Forever" (Magnus Carlsson song), 2007
"Live Forever" (Oasis song), 1994
"Live Forever" (Liam Payne song), 2019
"Live Forever", a song by Black Sabbath from the album 13
"Live Forever", a song by Hollywood Undead from Day of the Dead
"Live Forever", a song by Drew Holcomb and the Neighbors
"Live Forever", a 2010 single by Lange featuring Emma Hewitt 
"Live Forever", a 2015 song by Lil Peep

Other
Immortality, living for an infinite length of time
Live Forever: The Rise and Fall of Brit Pop, a 2003 documentary film

See also
Aizoon (Greek: "live forever"), a plant species named by Max Koch